Butler, is a surname that has been associated with many different places and people. It can be either:
 an Anglicisation of the French surname Boutilier, Bouthillier, a cognate of the English name.
 an English occupational name that originally denoted a servant in charge of the wine cellar, from the Norman French word butuiller. It eventually came to be used to describe a servant of high responsibility in a noble household, mostly leaving behind its association with the supply of wine.
 in Ireland, a noble family and dynasty associated with the counties of Tipperary, Kilkenny and parts of County Carlow.
 an Anglicisation of German or Swiss-German surnames including Beutler, Bütler, Beidler.

Notable people with the surname Butler

Disambiguation of common given names with this surname
Adam Butler (disambiguation), multiple people
Andrew Butler (disambiguation), multiple people
Anthony Butler (disambiguation), multiple people
Arthur Butler (disambiguation), multiple people
Benjamin Butler (disambiguation), multiple people
Bill Butler (disambiguation), multiple people
Brett Butler (disambiguation), multiple people
Charles Butler (disambiguation), multiple people
Chris Butler (disambiguation), multiple people
David Butler (disambiguation), multiple people
Daniel Butler (disambiguation), multiple people
Edward Butler (disambiguation), multiple people
Eleanor Butler (disambiguation), multiple people
Frank Butler (disambiguation), multiple people
George Butler (disambiguation), multiple people
Guy Butler (disambiguation), multiple people
Jack Butler (disambiguation), multiple people
James Butler (disambiguation), includes Jim Butler and Jimmy Butler
Jason Butler (disambiguation), multiple people
Jerry Butler (disambiguation), multiple people
John Butler (disambiguation), multiple people
Joseph Butler (disambiguation), multiple people
Kevin Butler (disambiguation), multiple people
Matthew Butler (disambiguation), multiple people
Michael Butler (disambiguation), multiple people
Paul Butler (disambiguation), multiple people
Percy Butler (disambiguation), multiple people
Pierce Butler (disambiguation), multiple people
Richard Butler (disambiguation), multiple people
Robert Butler (disambiguation), multiple people
Samuel Butler (disambiguation), multiple people
Sarah Butler (disambiguation), multiple people
Thomas Butler (disambiguation), multiple people
Tom Butler (disambiguation), multiple people
Tony Butler (disambiguation), multiple people
Walter Butler (disambiguation), multiple people
William Butler (disambiguation), multiple people

Arts and letters
Archie Butler (actor) (1911–1977), American actor, crewman, and stuntman
Artt Butler (born 1969), American voice actor
Austin Butler (born 1991), American actor
Bernard Butler (born 1970), English musician, of McAlmont and Butler
Bisa Butler (born 1973), American quilt artist
Blair Butler (born 1977), American comedy writer/comedian
Brian Patrick Butler, American actor and filmmaker
Bryon Butler (1934–2001), English sports writer and broadcaster
Champ Butler (1926–1992), American popular music singer
Charlotte Butler, 17th-century English actress
Cher Butler, American model and actor
Clementina Butler (1862–1949), American evangelist and author
Dan Butler, American actor
Daws Butler, American voice actor
Dean Butler (actor), Canadian/American actor
Dori Hillestad Butler, author of The Truth about Truman School and other children's books
Ellis Parker Butler, American writer
Elizabeth Thompson, Lady Butler, English artist
Francis Butler, American writer and dog-trainer
Geezer Butler, English musician, bass guitar player in Black Sabbath
Gerard Butler, Scottish actor
Grace Butler, New Zealand artist
Gwendoline Butler (1922–2013), English writer
Henry Butler, American jazz pianist
Hubert Butler, Irish essayist
Hugo Butler, Canadian screenwriter
Jazz Ishmael Butler, American rapper and singer known professionally as Lil Tracy
Jonathan Butler, South African singer-songwriter
Judith Butler, American feminist philosopher and queer theorist
Larry Butler (producer), American country music producer
Linda Butler, American photographer
Marcus Butler, British vlogger
Matt Butler, American singer-songwriter
Mildred Anne Butler (1858–1941), Irish artist
Nickolas Butler, American writer
Octavia E. Butler (1947–2006), American science fiction writer
Rachel Barton Butler (died 1920), American writer, lyricist and playwright
Ralph Butler, British lyricist
Reg Butler, English sculptor
Rhett Ayers Butler, American environmental journalist
Ross Butler (actor) (born 1990), American actor
Shay Butler, YouTube personality and vlogger
Terry Butler, American musician
Wanda Nero Butler (born 1958), American gospel musician
Win Butler, American musician
Yancy Butler, American actor

Politics, law
Christine Butler (1943–2017), British politician
Colvin G. Butler (1872–1961), American politician
David Butler (politician), first Governor of Nebraska
Dawn Butler, British politician
Eleanor Butler Sanders (1849–1905), American suffragist, civil rights activist
Elizabeth Butler-Sloss, English judge
Frederick Butler (1873–1961), British civil servant
Gordon H. Butler (1889–1964), American civil engineer and politician
Homer M. Butler, American politician
Josephine Butler, English activist of the Victorian era
Louis B. Butler, American judge
Manley Caldwell Butler (1925–2014), U.S. Representative from Virginia
Marion Butler, American politician
Marty Butler, American politician
Sir Milo Butler, governor-general of the Bahamas
Petra Butler, New Zealand legal academic
Robin Butler, British civil servant
Tubal Uriah Butler, Grenadian labour leader in Trinidad and Tobago
Walker Butler, American jurist and politician

Nobility

Charles Butler, 1st Earl of Arran (died 1758)
Edmund Butler, 2nd Viscount Mountgarret (died 1602)
Edmund Butler, 4th Viscount Mountgarret (1595–1679)
Edmund Butler, 10th Viscount Mountgarret (died 1779)
Edmund Butler, 11th Viscount Mountgarret (1745–1793)
Edmund Butler, 15th Viscount Mountgarret (1875–1918)
Edmund Butler, 1st Earl of Kilkenny (1771–1846)
Henry Butler, 13th Viscount Mountgarret (1816–1900)
Henry Butler, 14th Viscount Mountgarret (1844–1912)
James Butler, 1st Earl of Ormonde (c. 1305 – 1337)
James Butler, 2nd Earl of Ormonde (died 1382)
James Butler, 3rd Earl of Ormonde (died 1405)
James Butler, 4th Earl of Ormonde (died 1452)
James Butler, 5th Earl of Ormonde (1421–1462)
James Butler, 9th Earl of Ormonde (died 1546)
James Butler, 1st Duke of Ormonde (1610–1688) created Duke in 1661
James Butler, 2nd Duke of Ormonde (1665–1745)
James Arthur Wellington Foley Butler, 4th Marquess of Ormonde (1849–1943)
James Arthur Norman Butler, 6th Marquess of Ormonde (1893–1971)
James Edward William Theobald Butler, 3rd Marquess of Ormonde (1844–1919)
James George Anson Butler, 5th Marquess of Ormonde (1890–1949)
James Hubert Theobald Charles Butler, 7th Marquess of Ormonde (1899–1997)
James Wandesford Butler, 1st Marquess of Ormonde (1777–1838)
John Butler, 6th Earl of Ormonde (died 1478)
John Butler, 15th Earl of Ormonde (died 1766)
John Butler, 17th Earl of Ormonde (1740–1795)
John Butler, 2nd Marquess of Ormonde (1808–1854)
Piers Butler, 8th Earl of Ormonde (died 1539)(also 1st Earl of Ossory)
Piers Butler, 16th Viscount Mountgarret (1903–1966)
Piers Butler, 18th Viscount Mountgarret (born 1961)
Richard Butler, 1st Viscount Mountgarret (1500–1571)
Richard Butler, 3rd Viscount Mountgarret (1578–1651)
Richard Butler, 17th Viscount Mountgarret (1936–2004)
Theobald Walter, 1st Baron Butler, first Chief Butler of Ireland, father of Theobald le Botiller
Theobald Butler, 2nd Baron Butler, otherwise known as Theobald le Botiller
Thomas Butler, 7th Earl of Ormonde (died 1515)
Thomas Butler, 10th Earl of Ormonde (died 1614)
Walter Butler, 11th Earl of Ormonde (died 1632)
Walter Butler, 16th Earl of Ormonde (1703–1783)
Walter Butler, Marquess of Ormonde (1770–1820) created Marquess of Ormonde (Ireland) in 1816

Sciences
Amos Butler (1860–1937), American naturalist
Anne Butler (engineer). Irish Engineer
Arthur Gardiner Butler (1844–1925), English entomologist, arachnologist and ornithologist
Arthur Lennox Butler (1873–1939), British naturalist
Clifford Charles Butler, English physicist
Edward Albert Butler (1845–1925), English entomologist
Edward Arthur Butler (1843–1916), British ornithologist and army officer in India
Harry Butler, Australian naturalist
Hildred Mary Butler (1906–1975), Australian microbiologist
John Alfred Valentine Butler, English electrochemist
Laurie Butler (born 1955), American chemist, twin of Lynne
Lynne Butler (born 1955), American mathematician, twin of Laurie

Sports
Archie Butler, Australian rules footballer
Caron Butler, American basketball player
Charlie Butler-Henderson, British motor racing driver
Da'Sean Butler (born 1988), American basketball player
Deighton Butler (born 1974), West Indian cricketer
Darien Butler (born 2000), American football player
Darius Butler (born 1986), American football player
Dennis Butler, football manager
Duane Butler, American football player
Eddie Butler (baseball), American baseball player
Eddie Butler (rugby union), Welsh rugby union player and journalist
Hakeem Butler (born 1996), American football player
Ian Butler (cricketer) (born 1981), New Zealand cricketer
Jimmy Butler, American basketball player
Larry Butler (darts player), American darts player
LeRoy Butler, American football player
Malcolm Butler (born 1990), American football player
Malcolm Butler (Irish footballer) (1913–1987), Irish footballer
Mario Butler, Panamanian basketball player
Mitchell Butler (b. 1970), American sports agent and former basketball player
Percy Butler (born 2000), American football player
Phil Butler, rugby league footballer of the 1970s, and 1980s
Rasual Butler (1979–2018), American basketball player
Rich Butler, Canadian baseball player
Steve Butler, American racing driver
Todd Butler, American college baseball coach
Torrey Butler, American basketball player
Vicki Butler-Henderson, British racing driver and TV presenter
Wayde Butler, American football player

Other
Alban Butler (1710–1773), English Catholic priest and author
Anthea Butler (born 1950), American professor
Christopher Butler (1902–1986), English Catholic bishop
Lady Eileen Gwladys Butler (1891–1943), later Eileen Sutherland-Leveson-Gower, Duchess of Sutherland
Elizabeth Beardsley Butler, American surveyor of social conditions
Henry Montagu Butler (1833–1918), English academic
Lee Pierce Butler, American academic and librarian
Lucy Wood Butler (1820–1895), American temperance leader
Matthew Butler, American Confederate general
Montagu C. Butler, Esperantist, for whom the Montagu Butler Library is named
Nicholas Murray Butler, American academic administrator and politician
Norman 3X Butler, convicted for the killing of Malcolm X
Ovid Butler, American abolitionist for whom Butler University is named
Smedley Butler, major-general, son of Thomas S. Butler
Thaddeus J. Butler, American Catholic priest
W. E. Butler, British occultist

Fictional entities with the surname Butler
Faykan Butler, fictional character from the Dune universe
Rhett Butler, fictional character from Gone with the Wind
Serena Butler, fictional character from the Dune universe
Stan Butler, fictional character from On The Buses
Domovoi and Juliet Butler, fictional characters from the Artemis Fowl series

References

See also
Justice Butler (disambiguation)
Senator Butler (disambiguation)
Butler (disambiguation)
Buttler, including a list of people with this name

English-language surnames
Occupational surnames
Surnames of Norman origin
English-language occupational surnames